The Stamps Scholarship is a merit-based undergraduate scholarship that was established in 2006 by E. Roe Stamps and his late wife Penny, with the purpose of enabling extraordinary educational experiences for extraordinary students. Through partnerships with institutions across the nation (and into the U.K.), Scholars receive annual awards that range from $5,400 to $75,000 (four-year awards total an average of $21,600-$300,000) with additional funds for enrichment activities such as summer experiences, international travel and study, research, leadership programs, conferences and internships. Stamps Scholars receive several additional benefits, including the opportunity to attend a biennial national convention and online networking opportunities.

History
The Stamps Scholarship was founded by Roe and Penny Stamps in 2006.  The original scholarships were awarded to students at the University of Michigan and Georgia Tech, their alma maters.

The program expanded in 2009 to include the University of Miami and in 2010 to include Barry University, California Institute of Technology, the University of Florida, the University of Illinois and the University of Virginia. The program has since grown to 36 schools across the country with more than 2,600 current and alumni Stamps Scholars.

In 2021, 256 students were awarded Stamps Scholarships.

Benefits
The Stamps Scholarship usually covers tuition, mandatory fees, and room and board for four years of study.  Scholars also receive enrichment funds which can be used for studying abroad, internships, or research experiences.

National Convention
The Stamps Scholars Program sponsors a national convention every two years to encourage collaboration and connection among Stamps Scholars. The conventions offer Stamps Scholars the opportunity to hear from speakers, participate in discussions on a variety of topics, explore the host city's cultural atmosphere and perform in or watch a talent show featuring performances by Stamps Scholars.

Networking
A major benefit of the Stamps Scholarship is access to a national network of Scholars and alumni who are eager to connect. Scholars have the option to be included in an online, searchable directory, where they can post their career interests and information in order to connect with other like-minded individuals. They also have access to private LinkedIn and Facebook groups to enhance their professional opportunities.

Criteria and Eligibility
The Stamps Scholarship is entirely merit-based and does not consider financial need.  The Stamps Scholars Program and the partner schools consider academic merit, leadership potential, and character.

Awards
Stamps Scholars are among the recipients of other prestigious national and international awards, including the Rhodes, Marshall, Truman, and Fulbright. In 2019, 4 of the 32 American Rhodes Scholars were Stamps Scholars.

Partner Schools 
Schools with a Stamps Scholarship include:
Barry University
Boston College
College of William & Mary
Dartmouth
Elizabethtown College
Georgia Tech
Louisiana State University
Mercer University
Northeastern University
Oberlin College
 The Ohio State University
Purdue University
Queens' College, University of Cambridge, UK
Tulane University
 The U.S. Air Force Academy
 The U.S. Military Academy
 The U.S. Naval Academy
University of Arizona
University of Chicago
University of Connecticut
University of Florida
University of Georgia
University of Illinois
University of Miami
Frost School of Music
University of Michigan
University of Mississippi
University of Missouri
University of Notre Dame
University of Oregon
University of Pittsburgh
University of South Carolina
University of Southern California
University of Texas at Austin
University of Virginia
Virginia Tech
Wake Forest University

References

Scholarships in the United States
Educational foundations in the United States
Undergraduate education in the United States
Charities based in Georgia (U.S. state)